Mehnaun is a constituency of the Uttar Pradesh Legislative Assembly covering the city of Mehnaun in the Gonda district of Uttar Pradesh, India.

Mehnaun is one of five assembly constituencies in the Gonda Lok Sabha constituency. Since 2008, this assembly constituency is numbered 295 amongst 403 constituencies.

Election results

2022

2017
Bharatiya Janta Party candidate Vinay Kumar won in last Assembly election of 2017 Uttar Pradesh Legislative Elections defeating Bahujan Samaj Party candidate Arshad Ali Khan by a margin of 36,378 votes. As per my (Ajeet Kumar Verma) calculation Vinay Kumar is going to win 2022 assembly election with huge margin.

References

External links
 

Assembly constituencies of Uttar Pradesh
Gonda district